Billings (Valḳaran) is a rural locality (a selo) in Iultinsky District of Chukotka Autonomous Okrug, Russia. Population:  Municipally, it is incorporated as Billings Rural Settlement in Chaunsky Municipal District.

Etymology

Like the neighbouring village of Mys Shmidta, Billings is named after a nearby cape, which in turn was named after British Captain Joseph Billings (1758—1806) who was at the service of the Russian Imperial Navy during Catherine the Great's reign. The cape itself marks the point of separation between the Chukchi Sea and the East Siberian Sea. Joseph Billings was an English-born member of the Russian navy who in 1785, together with C. G. Sarychevym, was part of the expedition that mapped and researched the coast of North-Eastern Siberia. Using reindeer, he crossed Chukotka as far as Kolyuchinskaya Guba and mapped the area.

The local Chukchi people originally called the place "Valkyran", meaning a dugout of whale jaws. This is in reference to the remains of an ancient Inuit camp consisting of a number of homes dug into the soil and constructed of wood and the bones of the Greenland whale.

History

In 1935, a polar station was established on the site of the village for the first time, and two years later the first national council was established in the area named Valkyran after their traditional name for the area. In 1948, the local Chukchi herders were collectivised and named their new Sovkhoz after Lenin.

Geography
Billings is located on the coast of the East Siberian Sea, part of the Arctic Ocean, just east of Cape Billings. Other than the mining settlements of Leningradsky and Mys Shmidta, Billings is one of the few populated areas in this part of Russia between Cape Shelag and Cape Dezhnyov. Billings is situated near the former Chukchi settlement of Gytkhelen.

Demographics
The population of the village according to the most recent census data is 211, of whom 109 are male and 102 female, a significant decrease on a 2006 estimate of 324.

Administrative and municipal jurisdiction
Billings was part of Shmidtovsky Municipal District of Chukotka until that district was merged into Iultinsky Municipal District in 2008. On December 15, 2009, Billings was transferred to Chaunsky Municipal District. Administratively, however, Billings remained under the jurisdiction of Shmidtovsky Administrative District until the latter was merged into Iultinsky Administrative District in 2011 and ceased to exist.

Climate
Billings has an arctic tundra climate (Köppen climate classification ET) with extremely long, bitterly cold winters and very short, cold summers. Precipitation is low throughout the year, with summers being somewhat wetter than winters.

See also
List of inhabited localities in Chaunsky District

References

Sources
 
 

M Strogoff, P-C Brochet, and D. Auzias Petit Futé: Chukotka (2006). "Avant-Garde" Publishing House

Rural localities in Chukotka Autonomous Okrug
Populated places of Arctic Russia
Chukchi Sea